4040, 40-40 or 40/40 may refer to:

 The year 4040 in the 5th millennium

Computers
 Intel 4040, a microprocessor
 Commodore 4040, a model of floppy disk drive

Roads
 County Road 4040 (Volusia County, Florida), a historic road
 A4040 road, a road in Birmingham, England

Sports and games
 40–40 club, a term in baseball
 The 40/40 Club, a sports bar chain
 Forty forty, a children's game

Music
 40/40 (The Carpenters album)
 40/40: The Best Selection (Olivia Newton-John album)

Other
 4040 Purcell, an asteroid